Sibovia is a genus of leafhoppers in the family Cicadellidae. There are at least 30 described species in Sibovia.

Species

 Sibovia aprica (Melichar, 1926) c g
 Sibovia carahua Young, 1977 c g
 Sibovia chanchama Young, 1977 c g
 Sibovia civilis (Fowler, 1900) c g
 Sibovia composita (Fowler, 1900) c g
 Sibovia compta Fowler, 1900 c g b
 Sibovia conferta (Melichar, 1926) c g
 Sibovia conjuncta (Melichar, 1926) c g
 Sibovia corona Nielson & Godoy, 1995 c g
 Sibovia festana Young, 1977 c g
 Sibovia huasima Young, 1977 c g
 Sibovia improvisula Young, 1977 c g
 Sibovia inexpectata (Metcalf & Bruner, 1936) c g
 Sibovia infula (Melichar, 1926) c g
 Sibovia mesolinea (DeLong & Currie, 1959) c g
 Sibovia nielsoni Young, 1977 c g
 Sibovia occaminis Young, 1977 c g
 Sibovia occatoria Say, 1830 c g b
 Sibovia optabilis (Melichar, 1926) c g
 Sibovia picchitula Young, 1977 c g
 Sibovia pileata (Fowler, 1900) c g
 Sibovia praevia (Melichar, 1926) c g
 Sibovia prodigiosa (Melichar, 1926) c g
 Sibovia recta (Fowler, 1900) c g
 Sibovia sagata (Signoret, 1854) c g
 Sibovia skeeleae Young, 1977 c g
 Sibovia sororia (Fowler, 1900) c g
 Sibovia taeniatifrons (Schmidt, E., 1928) c g
 Sibovia tunicata (Fowler, 1900) c g
 Sibovia youngi Nielson & Godoy, 1995 c g

Data sources: i = ITIS, c = Catalogue of Life, g = GBIF, b = Bugguide.net

References

Further reading

External links

 

Cicadellidae genera
Cicadellini